Domus Academica, colloquially called Domma, is a student housing complex in the center of Helsinki, Finland, owned by the Student Union of the University of Helsinki. It offers various services for students and also houses various Student Union organisations.

The complex is internationally known for the Domus chair originally designed by Ilmari Tapiovaara for the building.

External links
Domus Academica - Official website 

Buildings and structures in Helsinki
University and college residential buildings